"A Scandal in Bohemia" is the first episode of the series The Adventures of Sherlock Holmes, the first series in the Sherlock Holmes series which is based on Sir Arthur Conan Doyle stories. The series was produced by the British television company Granada Television between 1984 and 1994 and star Jeremy Brett as the famous detective. "A Scandal in Bohemia" is based on the short story of the same title. The episode was first aired at 9:00 PM in the United Kingdom on Tuesday, April 24, 1984, on ITV.

Plot

The ransacking of Irene Adler's home 

The episode begins with two burglars (in the Duke's pay) shown ransacking Irene Adler's house. Irene's coachman John catches the burglars in the act. Irene herself follows John into the room with a revolver in her hand. Without summoning the police, Irene brandishes the gun and motions the burglars to leave. John tries to protest but Irene asks him to close the windows.

A voice over of Dr. Watson tells us that the beautiful Irene Adler of "dubious and questionable memory" has always been "The Woman" to Sherlock Holmes.

The letter and the visitor 
The scene cuts to Baker Street at night time. Dr. Watson's voice over explains that at the time of the case of Irene Adler, he and Sherlock Holmes had been sharing rooms at Baker Street for some years. His practice has kept him away for a few days and he has now returned, filled with apprehension as to Holmes' mood.

The scene changes to the insides of their room on Baker Street where Dr. Watson meets Mrs. Hudson who tells him that Holmes has been "all on edge" and that she has received instructions not to bring him supper until she is called.

Dr. Watson enters the drawing room to find Holmes sitting in an armchair staring into the fireplace. Just when he is about to express his exasperation at the pile of papers lying untidily on the table, he sees a syringe in the half open drawer of the table and thinks that Holmes has indulged in a dose of Morphine or Cocaine, but Holmes corrects him saying that his true stimulant in a letter that he has received by the morning post.

Dr. Watson notices that the letter is undated, unsigned and unaddressed. The letter states that a gentleman wants to consult Holmes on a matter of importance. They deduce from the letter that the writing is that of a man and that the paper is of German origin. From the grammar of the letter they deduce that the writer is also German (".. only a German is so uncourteous to his verbs.."). Just when they have finished their deductions, they see a brougham driven by a pair of horses pull up at their door step. Dr. Watson wants to leave before the visitor arrives because he thinks the visitor will demand secrecy in the matter, but Sherlock insists on him staying.

The visitor (wearing a domino mask) rushes into the drawing room followed by Mrs. Hudson who is protesting that he cannot meet Sherlock Holmes without an appointment, but Holmes tells her that it is fine and asks her to leave the room. The visitor introduces himself as Count Von Kramm, a Bohemian nobleman. After obtaining a promise from Sherlock Holmes and Dr. Watson to maintain absolute secrecy about the matter for a period 2 years, he goes on to say that the matter concerns the house of Ormstein, the hereditary kings of Bohemia. The visitor also confesses that the title that he has introduced himself with isn't his own. He is surprised when Holmes says that he has already deduced both these facts, and he takes his mask off revealing that he himself is Wilhelm Gottsreich Sigismond von Ormstein, Grand Duke of Cassel-Felstein and the hereditary King of Bohemia.

The problem 

The king then goes on to explain that about 10 years ago during a visit to Warsaw, he came to know an adventuress of the name Irene Adler. Holmes deduces that the king wants to recover compromising letters that he wrote to her then. On looking her up in the index, they find out that Irene Adler was born in New Jersey in 1858, that she is a singer, that she has retired from the operatic stage, and that she now resides in London making occasional stage appearances.

The scene cuts to a flashback, where the king and Irene are seen ball dancing while musicians play with their eyes blindfolded.

In the present time, in answer to Holmes question about how Irene can prove the authenticity of the letters, the king tells Holmes that she has a photograph that has both her and the king and in it.

The king tells Holmes and Dr. Watson that all attempts to recover the photograph from Irene have failed. That after two attempts of burglary, one attempt of redirecting her luggage during her travel and two attempts at waylaying her, the location of the photograph is still unknown and that she refuses to sell it.

Holmes is impressed at Irene's cleverness in hiding the photograph and can't help bursting out in laughter at the failed attempts of the king, making the king angry.

In answer to Holmes' question about her intentions with the photograph, the king tells him that she plans to use it to ruin his reputation. The king is about to marry Clotilde Lothman von Saxe-Meiningen, a young Scandinavian princess and if the photograph becomes public the marriage would be called off.

After giving them money to spend and the addresses of both himself and Irene Adler, the king leaves.

Holmes' investigations at Briony Lodge 

Holmes goes to Briony Lodge, Irene Adler's residence in London, in the disguise of an out-of-work groom and manages to find employment there. Later at their residence on Baker Street, while removing his disguise, Holmes tells Dr. Watson that he was able to find out from the locals about her daily schedule and that she has only one regular visitor, a lawyer of the name Godfrey Norton of the Inner Temple.

The scene cuts to show an earlier time that day when Holmes is working on trimming the hedge at Briony Lodge and Irene is singing in her home. In a voice over, Holmes tells Dr. Watson how beautiful her voice is. While he is listening to her song, Godfrey Norton arrives there in a cab and enters the house. He is there for a short while and leaves by the same cab telling the cab man to drive as fast as he can to the Church of St. Monica in Edgware Road. Shortly after Norton, Irene leaves in her carriage as well.

In the present time, Holmes tells Dr. Watson that Irene has a "face a man might die for". Dr. Watson is surprised at his use of such language considering his dislike for women.

The scene cuts back to the time when Holmes has followed Godfrey and Irene in a cab to the church. In the church, it turns out at Godfrey and Irene are about to get married. Godfrey asks Holmes to be a witness to their marriage. After the marriage, Irene summons Holmes and gives him a sovereign as a souvenir for being present in the hour of need and both Godfrey and Irene go separate ways.

In the present time, Holmes tells Dr. Watson that he will need his assistance in activities later that night that may be out of the law and they may even risk an arrest, to which Dr. Watson readily agrees.

The drama at Briony Lodge 

The scene opens with Dr. Watson and Holmes driving to Briony Lodge. It is night and Holmes is in the disguise of a clergyman. Holmes tells Dr. Watson that he plans on letting Irene herself show him where the photograph is kept, an idea that Dr. Watson finds amusing and hard to believe. They leave the cab a little distance before Briony Lodge. Quite a few people are seen meandering along the street. Holmes asks Dr. Watson to follow the instructions he has already given him - to act as soon as Holmes raises his hand.

Shortly afterwards, Adler arrives in her coach and 2 young men from the street rush to open the coach door for her. A fight breaks out between the young men over who gets to help Adler. Holmes enacts his plan and intervenes to stop the fight and to protect Adler. One of the men strikes Holmes and he is seemingly injured. Adler asks for Holmes to be carried into her home.

Inside her home, Holmes pretends to faint and asks the maid to open the window for some air. He asks Adler if she has any smelling salts, and while she is away to get it, raises his hand and motions to Dr. Watson, who is just outside the windows waiting for his cue. Dr. Watson tosses a plumber's smoke rocket into the room through the window. While the smoke from the rocket fills in the room, Holmes raises a cry of "Fire!" and in the confusion that ensues Adler rushes to open a panel in the wall that reveals a button, but before she can press it she notices that Holmes is watching her do that. She immediately closes the panel probably realizing that the whole thing was a ruse to get her to reveal the hiding place.

Holmes points out that the smoke is coming from the rocket and asks the coachman to tell the people outside on the street that it was a false alarm. With the hiding place now known, Holmes leaves in spite of Adler's insistence on him staying back for some refreshments.

Climax 

As they drive back to Baker Street, Holmes tells Dr. Watson how Adler showed him the hiding place as expected. He tells him that he plans on calling early the next morning at Briony Lodge as himself with the king and Dr. Watson to collect the photograph. While Holmes and Dr. Watson are about to enter their home on Baker Street, another coach stops nearby, and a person gets off. Only the person's shoes are seen. The person walks past Holmes and Dr. Watson and greets Holmes good night. By the time both of them turn around and look, the person is seen walking away rapidly with the back facing them.

The next day when Holmes, Dr Watson and the king go to Briony Lodge, they find that Adler has already left England for the continent, never to return. Holmes presses the button in the panel to open a secret compartment that contains a different photograph of Adler alone and a letter addressed to himself. In her letter Adler tells Holmes that she had been warned earlier about him and that last night when she had inadvertently revealed the hiding place she had come to know that she had been tricked by Holmes. Being trained as an actress herself, it was she who in a man's disguise followed Holmes, just to make sure, and greeted him good night at his door step. She says that she has now kept the photograph with her only to safeguard herself from the king and that she does not plan on using it against him anymore.

The scene cuts to a ship aboard which Adler and Norton are leaving England forever. Alder throws the photograph of her and the king into the sea.

In the ending scene Holmes apologizes to the king about having failed in actually acquiring the photograph from Adler to which the king says that the photograph is now as good as it was in the fire, as Adler's word is inviolate and she will never use it if she says she won't. He offers Holmes his ring as a reward but Holmes asks for Adler's photograph instead and walks away without shaking the king's hand which he has held out. This shows Holmes' character at the climax.

Cast

See also 
 The Red-Headed League (Sherlock Holmes)

References

External links

Works based on Sherlock Holmes